Haddubangi is a village located in Gajapati district of Orissa and also center of Orissa-Andhra border. Express bus services are available from Haddubangi to towns of Andhra Pradesh like Srikakulam, Vizianagaram and Visakhapatnam. And also to towns of Orissa like Parlakhemundi, Gunupur, etc. Haddubangi station is located on Naupada-Gunupur railway.

References
haddubangi is the panchayat head quaqrter of the hadubhangi Gp the surrounding villages are vistala, chudangapur, parusarampurand konduru.chudangapur upgraded high school is the only high school in the panchayat

External links

Villages in Gajapati district